The 2014 Belgian Basketball Supercup, for sponsorship reasons the Generali Supercup, was the 18th edition of the game since its official foundation of the actual cup in 1997. It was traditionally played in De Stormmeeuw, in Knokke. The 2013–14 Champion and Cup winner Telenet Oostende won its fourth Supercup, by crushing Port of Antwerp Giants 103–62.Oostende crush Antwerp to earn SuperCup title

Match

References

2014
Supercup